Mick Cahill (born 1938 in Dublin) is an Irish former footballer who played as a centre half.

Biography 
He joined Shamrock Rovers in 1962 from Bohemians. He captained Bohs in 1961/62 during his time at Dalymount Park, five years before his brother Paul would do so. They joined a prestigious list of brothers such as the Hoopers, O'Kanes and Kerrs who captained The Gypsies. Mick received two amateur international caps and captained his country against England in February 1961 in a 1-1 draw in Dalymount Park.

He played twice in the UEFA Cup Winners' Cup for Rovers.

Signed for Transport F.C. in 1965 and later played for Drumcondra F.C.

Honours
League of Ireland
  Shamrock Rovers - 1963/64
League of Ireland Shield: 3
 Shamrock Rovers - 1962/63, 1963/64, 1964/65
Leinster Senior Cup (football)
 Shamrock Rovers - 1964
Dublin City Cup
 Shamrock Rovers - 1963/64

Personal life
Cahill was a successful greyhound racing owner during the 1980s, winning various open races.

Sources
 The Hoops by Paul Doolan and Robert Goggins
 Bohemian F.C. Match Programme, 29 January 1989

References

Association footballers from County Dublin
Republic of Ireland association footballers
Shamrock Rovers F.C. players
Bohemian F.C. players
Drumcondra F.C. players
League of Ireland players
League of Ireland XI players
1938 births
Living people
Transport F.C. players
Association football central defenders
People in greyhound racing